"All That's Left" is a single by Thrice from the album The Artist in the Ambulance. "All That's Left" was released to radio on June 17, 2003. Both a single and enhanced CD version were released for the song in 2003. The album art for the single (which is pictured on the right) is almost identical to the album art for the enhanced CD. For some reason, all track duration times are incorrectly listed on the single and enhanced CD, except for the track duration time for "All That's Left [CD-ROM Video]" (on the enhanced CD). Also, the first track on the enhanced CD is incorrectly labelled "All That's Left [Album Version]", when it is actually the radio edit version. The correct track listing and track duration times are listed below. The song is featured on the soundtrack for Madden NFL 04

Track listing 
All That's Left Single
 "All That's Left [Radio Edit]" - 3:10

All That's Left Enhanced CD
 "All That's Left [Radio Edit]" - 3:12
 "Stare at the Sun [Acoustic]" - 3:42
 "Motion Without Meaning" - 1:54
 "All That's Left [CD-ROM Video]" - 3:09

Note: "Motion Without Meaning" was later renamed "Motion Isn't Meaning".

Charts

References

2003 singles
Thrice songs
2003 songs
Island Records singles
Song recordings produced by Brian McTernan